or  is an island in the municipality of Hamarøy in Nordland county, Norway. The island is located in the Tysfjorden, southwest of the village of Kjøpsvik. Hulløya had one permanent resident in 2016.

An express boat service connects Kjøpsvik (on the mainland) with Hulløyhamn (on Hulløya) and other villages in the fjord several times per week.

References

Hamarøy
Islands of Nordland